Eastwood was an electoral district of the Legislative Assembly in the Australian state of New South Wales from 1927 to 1930 and from 1950 to 1999. It included Eastwood. It was abolished in 1999, and mostly replaced by Epping.

Members for Eastwood

Election results

References

Former electoral districts of New South Wales
1927 establishments in Australia
Constituencies established in 1927
1930 disestablishments in Australia
Constituencies disestablished in 1930
1950 establishments in Australia
Constituencies established in 1950
1999 disestablishments in Australia
Constituencies disestablished in 1999